The Râșnoava or Valea Râșnoavei is a right tributary of the river Prahova in Romania. It flows into the Prahova near Predeal.

References 

Rivers of Romania
Rivers of Brașov County